The Burning Ship fractal, first described and created by Michael Michelitsch and Otto E. Rössler in 1992, is generated by iterating the function:

 

in the complex plane  which will either escape or remain bounded. The difference between this calculation and that for the Mandelbrot set is that the real and imaginary components are set to their respective absolute values before squaring at each iteration. The mapping is non-analytic because its real and imaginary parts do not obey the Cauchy–Riemann equations.

Implementation 

The below pseudocode implementation hardcodes the complex operations for Z. Consider implementing complex number operations to allow for more dynamic and reusable code. Note that the typical images of the Burning Ship fractal display the ship upright: the actual fractal, and that produced by the below pseudocode, is inverted along the x-axis.

 for each pixel (x, y) on the screen, do:
     x := scaled x coordinate of pixel (scaled to lie in the Mandelbrot X scale (-2.5, 1))
     y := scaled y coordinate of pixel (scaled to lie in the Mandelbrot Y scale (-1, 1))
 
     zx := x // zx represents the real part of z
     zy := y // zy represents the imaginary part of z 
 
     iteration := 0
     max_iteration := 100
   
     while (zx*zx + zy*zy < 4 and iteration < max_iteration) do
         xtemp := zx*zx - zy*zy + x 
         zy := abs(2*zx*zy) + y // abs returns the absolute value
         zx := xtemp
         iteration := iteration + 1
 
     if iteration = max_iteration then // Belongs to the set
         return insideColor
 
     return (max_iteration / iteration) × color

References

External links

About properties and symmetries of the Burning Ship fractal, featured by Theory.org
Burning Ship Fractal, Description and C source code.
Burning Ship with its Mset of higher powers and Julia Sets
Burningship, Video,
Fractal webpage includes the first representations and the original paper cited above on the Burning Ship fractal.
3D representations of the Burning Ship fractal
FractalTS Mandelbrot, Burning ship and corresponding Julia set generator.

Fractals
Articles with example pseudocode